The 2018–19 Ranji Trophy was the 85th season of the Ranji Trophy, the first-class cricket tournament that took place in India. It was contested by 37 teams, divided into four groups, with ten teams in Group C. The group stage ran from 1 November 2018 to 10 January 2019. The top two teams from Group C progressed to the quarter-finals of the competition.

On 2 January 2019, Rajasthan became the first team to qualify for the quarter-finals, after they beat Goa by ten wickets. Goa were relegated from Group C to the Plate Group for the next season. On the final day of the group stage, Uttar Pradesh qualified from Group C for the quarter-finals.

Points table

Fixtures

Round 1

Round 2

Round 3

Round 4

Round 5

Round 6

Round 7

Round 8

Round 9

References

Ranji Trophy seasons
Ranji Trophy Group C
Ranji Trophy
Ranji Trophy